Danson Mwashako Mwakuwona is a Kenyan economist and politician. He is currently serving as the Member of Parliament for Wundanyi Constituency.

Mwashako was elected to the Kenyan Parliament in 2017 and was re-elected in 2022 for his second term. He was elected under Wiper Democratic Movement – Kenya party ticket.

References 

Living people
Members of the 12th Parliament of Kenya
Members of the 13th Parliament of Kenya
Wiper Democratic Movement – Kenya politicians
Year of birth missing (living people)